First Evangelical Church of Albany (Albany Open Bible Standard Church) is a historic church at 1120 SW 12 Avenue in Albany, Oregon.

It was built in 1875 and added to the National Register in 1984.

References

Evangelical churches in Oregon
Churches on the National Register of Historic Places in Oregon
Carpenter Gothic church buildings in Oregon
Churches completed in 1875
National Register of Historic Places in Linn County, Oregon
Buildings and structures in Albany, Oregon
1875 establishments in Oregon